Anton "Toni" Seelos (4 March 1911 – 1 June 2006) was an Austrian alpine skier and world champion.

In the 1930s, Seelos invented the parallel turn and became a world champion in the slalom and alpine combination in 1933, and again in slalom and in combination in 1935.

Seelos worked as professional ski instructor, and was therefore not allowed to participate in the Olympic games. He was also trainer and instructor for Christl Cranz and the French ski team with Emile Allais.

The Toni-Seelos-Olympiaschanze in Seefeld in Tirol is named after him.

References

External links

1911 births
2006 deaths
Austrian male alpine skiers
Seefeld in Tirol